Cryptographic High Value Product (CHVP) is a designation used within the information security community to identify assets that have high value, and which may be used to encrypt / decrypt secure communications, but which do not retain or store any classified information.  When disconnected from the secure communication network, the CHVP equipment may be handled with a lower level of controls than required for COMSEC equipment.

See also
 COMSEC
 CCI
 Multibook

References
 CHVP SUITE B
 NIST Computer Security Resource Center

Cryptography